The 2009–10 Kategoria Superiore was the 74th season of top-tier football in Albania and the twelfth season under the name Kategoria superiore. The season began on 23 August 2009 and ended on 19 May 2010. Tirana was the defending champions.

Team changes from last season
Lushnja and Elbasani were directly relegated to the Kategoria e Parë after finishing 11th and 12th in the previous year's standings. They were replaced by Kategoria e Parë champions Laçi and runners-up Skënderbeu.

9th placed Bylis and 10th placed Partizani had to compete in single-match relegation play-offs. Both teams were relegated in the process by losing against the third and fourth-placed teams from Kategoria e Parë, Kastrioti and Gramozi.

Teams

Stadia and last season

Personnel and sponsoring

League table

Results
The schedule consists of three rounds. During the first two rounds, each team plays each other once home and away for a total of 22 matches. The pairings of the third round will then be set according to the standings after the first two rounds, giving every team a third game against each opponent for a total of 33 games per team.

First and second round

Third round

Relegation playoffs
Kastrioti and Skënderbeu finished 9th and 10th, respectively, in the league competition and therefore had to participate in a relegation playoff to keep their spots in the league. Skënderbeu Korçë faced Kamza, who finished third in the First Division and Kastrioti Krujë faced Lushnja, who finished fourth in the First Division.

Top goalscorers
Source: Soccerway

Season statistics

Scoring
First goal of the season: Robert Alviž for Flamurtari Vlorë against KF Tirana, 11 minutes (23 August 2009).
Fastest goal in a match: 1 minute – Daniel Xhafaj for Besa Kavajë against Vllaznia Shkodër (29 November 2009).
Goal scored at the latest point in a match: 90+3 minutes
Ilir Nallbani for Vllaznia Shkodër against Apolonia Fier (30 August 2009).
Robert Grizhaj for Kastrioti Krujë against Apolonia Fier (7 November 2009).
Robert Alviž for Flamurtari Vlorë against Kastrioti Krujë (21 November 2009).
First own goal of the season: Shpëtim Moçka (Flamurtari Vlorë) for Teuta Durrës, 24 minutes (19 September 2009).
First penalty kick of the season: 37 minutes – Devis Mema for Flamurtari Vlorë against KF Tirana (23 August 2009).
Widest winning margin: 4 goals
Dinamo Tirana 4-0 Gramozi Ersekë (31 October 2009).
Shkumbini Peqin 4-0 Dinamo Tirana (19 December 2009).

Championship-winning squad

Notes

References

External links
 Official website 

2009-10
Albanian Superliga
1